The 2013–14 Burkinabé Premier League is the 52nd edition of top flight football in Burkina Faso. A total of sixteen teams competed in the season beginning on 7 December 2013 and ending on 27 July 2014.

Teams 
Source:
ASF Bobo Dioulasso 
ASFA
Bobo Sport
Comoé
Étoile Filante
Kadiogo 
KOZAF 
Koudougou
Majestic
RC Bobo Dioulasso
Santos 
SONABEL
USFA 
US FRAN
Ouagadougou 
Yatenga

League table

References 

Premier League
Premier League
Burkina Faso
Burkinabé Premier League seasons